Nicola Bacciocchi (born 16 December 1971) is one of San Marino's most experienced football players, now retired from playing.

International career
He played for the San Marino national football team from 1991 to 2000.

External links

1971 births
Living people
Sammarinese footballers
Association football midfielders
San Marino international footballers